Peter Grønland   (15 October 1761 – 30 December 1825) was a Danish composer.

Notable works 
Melodien zu den gesellschaftlichen Liederbuche (1796)
Notenbuch zu das akademischen Liederbuchs erstem Bändchen (1783)
Wundersame Liebesgeschichte der schönen Magelone und des Grafen Peter (1813)
Osterfeyer (1818)
Alte schwedische Volks-Melodien (1818)
Zwey Sonette
Lieder, Balladen und Romanzen von Goethe
Die erste Walburgisnacht (Goethe)

See also
List of Danish composers

References
This article was initially translated from the Danish Wikipedia.

Danish composers
Male composers
1761 births
1825 deaths